Oderah Obiageli Chidom (born 9 July 1995) is a Nigerian-American professional basketball player who plays for the Nigeria women's national team.  

Chidom has two younger siblings: a brother, Arinze, and a sister, Amara. She went to Bishop O’Dowd High School in Oakland, California, where she played on their Varsity Women’s basketball team.  

She played for Duke University. She was drafted by the Atlanta Dream. She played for the Tsmoki-Minsk. She signed to play for Angers.

She participated at the U17 Women's Basketball Championship.
She participated at 2019 EuroCup Women.
She qualified for the 2020 Summer Olympics.

References

External links 
Oderah Chidom FIBA EuroCup Women Highlights 2019/2020 Season

1995 births
Atlanta Dream draft picks
Living people
Basketball players at the 2020 Summer Olympics
Centers (basketball)
Nigerian women's basketball players
Olympic basketball players of Nigeria
American women's basketball players
Citizens of Nigeria through descent
African-American basketball players
Nigerian people of African-American descent
American emigrants to Nigeria
American sportspeople of Nigerian descent
21st-century African-American sportspeople